Nikoli may refer to:

Nikoli (horse), an Irish racehorse
Nikoli (publisher), a Japanese publisher of puzzle games

People with the name
Nikoli Edwards (born 1991), Trinidad and Tobago politician
Elena Nikoli (born 1982), Greek handball player
Hadji Nikoli (1826–1892), Bulgarian merchant and patriot

See also 
 Nikola (disambiguation)